Hnaberd or Gnaberd or Khnaberd may refer to:
Hnaberd, Aragatsotn, Armenia
Hnaberd, Ararat, Armenia